Effort & Love is a Cantopop album by Edmond Leung.

Track listing
Battleship Team (艦隊)
8 Mile Highway (八里公路)
The General (大將)
Good Friends (夠朋友)
The Saddest Thing (最悲哀的事)
DJ
A Bet's A Bet (願賭服輸)
Have A Nice Trip (祝你旅途愉快)
3000 Years Of Flowering (三千年開花)
Look For Me (找我)

Music Awards

References

Edmond Leung albums
2004 albums
Cantonese-language albums